The 2022 Berlin Marathon was the 48th edition of the annual marathon race in Berlin, which took place on Sunday, .  An Elite Platinum Label marathon, it was the first of four World Marathon Majors events to be held over the span of six weeks. 45,527 runners with 34,879 finishers from 157 countries have taken part in the event.

Kenyan runner Eliud Kipchoge set a new marathon world record, winning the race with a time of 2:01:09, and beating the previous record, which he had set himself four years ago in Berlin, by 30 seconds.  This was Kipchoge's fourth victory at the Berlin Marathon, making him the second runner to win the race four times, after Ethiopian runner Haile Gebrselassie.  

Ethiopian runner Tigist Assefa won the race with a time of 2:15:37, setting a new course record in Berlin with her second marathon race.  Assefa's time was also the third-fastest woman's marathon time ever, and broke her personal record by over 18 minutes.

Swiss wheelchair athlete Marcel Hug claimed his seventh Berlin Marathon victory with a time of 1:24:56, while another Swiss wheelchair athlete, Catherine Debrunner, won the race with a time of 1:36:47 in her marathon debut.

Competitors 

Kenyan runner Eliud Kipchoge entered as the pre-race favorite.  Before the race, he was the holder of the marathon world record, which he had set with a finish time of 2:01:39 four years prior at the 2018 Berlin Marathon.  Kipchoge's 2022 win made him the second runner to have won the Berlin Marathon four times, after Ethiopian runner Haile Gebrselassie.

Also competing was Ethiopian runner Guye Adola, the defending champion, who had won the previous year's marathon with a time of 2:05:45.  The 2017 Berlin Marathon was Adola's marathon debut, where he finished with a time of 2:03:46, the fastest marathon debut ever at the time.  That year, Adola came in second to Kipchoge, who won with a time of 2:03:32.

Prior to this race, Ethiopian runner Tigist Assefa had run only one other marathon, the inaugural Riyadh Marathon earlier in March, which she had finished with a time of 2:34:01.  Assefa had previously largely specialized in 800-metre races during her running career.  During the summer, Assefa had run a number of 10,000-metre track races before focusing her attention back on marathon training.  Keira D'Amato, holder of the U.S. record for the marathon, and Kenyan runner Vibian Chepkirui, winner of the 2022 Vienna City Marathon, also ran the race.  D'Amato had won the 2022 Houston Marathon with a time of 2:19:12 to set the U.S. record.  In addition, Kenyan runner Rosemary Wanjiru debuted at the marathon distance with this race.

Also competing were Swiss wheelchair athlete Marcel Hug, winner of the 2021 Tokyo Marathon; U.S. wheelchair athlete Daniel Romanchuk, winner of the 2022 Boston Marathon; and Swiss wheelchair athlete Manuela Schär, winner of the previous five Berlin Marathons.  Swiss wheelchair athlete Catherine Debrunner, the reigning Paralympic champion in the women's T53 400-metre race, also made her marathon debut in this race.

Race

Men's race 

Intending to run a fast first half, Eliud Kipchoge started the race at a blistering pace that only a few runners were able to keep up with, including Ethiopian runner Andamlak Belihu and defending champion Guye Adola.  The leaders crossed the  mark in 28:23 before Adola began to fall behind about  into the race.  Kipchoge, Belihu, and the pacemakers reached the  mark in 42:32, leading to speculation that Kipchoge may have been able to finish the race in under two hours.  The runners then passed the halfway point with a time of 59:51, which was well under world-record pace, as Kipchoge had taken 96 seconds longer to complete the first half during his record-breaking 2018 run.

The last pacemaker eventually broke off from the group around the  mark, and Belihu started falling back about  later. With  left in the race, Kipchoge eventually started to slow down, hitting the  mark in 1:25:40, and then the  mark only slightly more than a minute faster than he did in 2018.

Kipchoge's finish time of 2:01:09 ended up shaving 30 seconds off his previous world record.  In second place, nearly five minutes behind, was his compatriot Mark Korir, who finished with a time of 2:05:58.  Ethiopian runner Tadu Abate took third place with a time of 2:06:28.  Belihu finished in 2:06:40 and came in fourth, while Adola never recorded a  split time.

Women's race 

The women also began the race at a quick pace, with the lead runners crossing the  mark at 16:22 and the  mark at 32:36. She crossed the finish line with a time of 2:15:37, breaking the previous course record by 2 minutes and 34 seconds, and her own personal record by 18 minutes and 24 seconds. Assefa's performance in this race, her second marathon ever, was also the third-fastest marathon ever. In addition, it made her the only woman to have completed both an 800-metre race in under 2 minutes, and a marathon in under 2 hours and 20 minutes. Assefa's second half, which she completed in 1:07:25, was faster than her first half, meaning that she ran the race with a negative split.

Rosemary Wanjiru, in her debut marathon, was able to beat Ethiopian runner Tigist Abayechew by three seconds to claim second place.  Though they both trailed Assefa by over two minutes, their finish times of 2:18:00 and 2:18:03 meant that all three podium finishers broke the course record of 2:18:11, set by Kenyan runner Gladys Cherono in the 2018 marathon.

Keira D'Amato did not keep up with the lead pack, falling behind by three seconds as early as the  mark, and by seven seconds at the  mark.  Though she was 74 seconds behind the leaders by the halfway point, D'Amato's split of 1:09:27 was still on target to break the U.S. record.  Experiencing cramps during the second half of the race, D'Amato eventually slowed down, and walked briefly around  into the race.  Despite the setback, she was still able to finish in sixth place with a time of 2:21:48, her second-best marathon time.

Canadian runner Natasha Wodak ran a personal best time of 2:23:12, finishing in twelfth place and setting a new Canadian record by nearly 100 seconds.

Wheelchair races 

In the men's race, Marcel Hug, Daniel Romanchuk, and British athlete David Weir were racing together in the lead pack until around  into the race, when Hug made his move and broke away from the others.  Keeping a fast pace for the rest of the race, Hug won with a time of 1:24:56, nearly four minutes ahead of Romanchuk, who finished second with a time of 1:28:54.  Weir came in third place with a time of 1:29:02.  Hug's win was his seventh at the Berlin Marathon.

Amongst the women, there was no clear leader for most of the race, with defending champion Manuela Schär, U.S. athlete Susannah Scaroni, and debut marathoner Catherine Debrunner keeping pace with each other until the final sprint.  Debrunner emerged victorious with a time of 1:36:47, breaking Schär's streak of five Berlin Marathon wins.  Schär crossed the finish line three seconds later, and Scaroni completed the podium a second after Schär's finish.

Results

Results for the top ten in the running races and top three in the wheelchair races are listed below.

Notes

References

External links 
 Official site

Marathon
2022 marathons
2022
September 2022 sports events in Germany